Skiathos Alexandros Papadiamantis Airport   is an airport on the island of Skiathos, Greece. Its 5,341-foot(1628 meters) runway is able to accommodate aircraft up to the size of a Boeing 767-200. The runway is characterised as 'short and narrow'. Because of the uneven terrain on the island of Skiathos, Skiathos Airport was created by reclaiming land from the sea between Skiathos island and the smaller island of Lazareta (a former leper colony) effectively joining the two islands into one larger island, though it was however built on land already part of Skiathos. The place was chosen by a mechanic who lived in Volos. The airport is named after Alexandros Papadiamantis, a Greek novelist and native of the island.

The airport's short runway and its proximity to an adjacent public road have made it a popular destination for planespotters. It is often compared to Princess Juliana International Airport on Saint Maarten since both airports offer the public an ability to legally experience landing approaches and takeoffs at very close range.

History 
The airport first operated in 1972.

A passenger terminal and a new control tower was constructed in 1988. In 2001 the terminal was closed down by a minor earthquake, and a new passenger terminal opened in 2002, to better accommodate the growing number of passengers.

From 2019, as part of the Fraport construction works the airport has 2 current terminals. Terminal 1 was reconstructed and is currently the Domestic Terminal, and Terminal 2 is for international arrivals.

Skiathos Airport has no jetways, meaning, prior to the 2016 work, passengers walked the short distance from the aircraft to the terminal building, now, a collection of buses drive passengers the short distance.

From 2014, there was extension to the runway and a new taxiway was introduced. The runway was extended by 110 metres on the north side of the airport. An extension was added to the taxiway, for an additional 4–5 parking stands. The airport has the capacity for only 6 additional parking stands. This opened in 2016.

The island has only a roundabout at the airport, and 1 set of Traffic lights at the end of the runway.

In December 2015, the privatization of Skiathos Island National Airport and 13 other regional airports of Greece was finalised with the signing of the agreement between the Fraport AG/Copelouzos Group joint venture and the state privatization fund. "We signed the deal today," the head of Greece's privatization agency HRADF, Stergios Pitsiorlas, told Reuters. According to the agreement, the joint venture will operate the 14 airports (including Skiathos Island National Airport) for 40 years as of 11 April 2017.

Future of Skiathos International Airport – Fraport Greece’s investment plan
On 22 March 2017, Fraport-Greece presented its master plan for the 14 Greek regional airports, including the Skiathos International Airport.

Immediate actions that will be implemented at the airports as soon as Fraport Greece takes over operations, before the launch of the 2017 summer season include:
 General re-organisation and reworking of terminal
 Improving lighting, marking of airside areas
 Replacing sanitary facilities with newer systems
 Enhancing services and offering new free Internet connection (WiFi)
 Implementing works to improve fire safety in all the areas of the airports

The following summarizes the enhancement changes that will be implemented for Skiathos International Airport under Fraport Greece's investment plan by 2021:
 Expansion and reorganisation of the terminal building, alongside general clean-up of the apron area
 Additional check-in desk for the current number (from 9 to 10)
 Additional departure gate, expanding the current number of three to four
 Addition of a brand-new security lane to the current one

Airlines and destinations
The following airlines operate regular scheduled and charter flights at Skiathos Airport:

Traffic figures

The data taken from the official website of the airport.

{|
|- valign="top"
|

Traffic statistics by country (2022)

Ground transport
Skiathos Airport is located 4.5 km from the city of Skiathos and is accessible either from Skiathos ringroad or the coast road. The journey to and from the city centre takes about 10–15 minutes, depending on traffic. 24/7 metered taxi service is available outside the Skiathos Airport Terminal building.

See also
 List of airports in Greece

References

Airports in Greece
Skiathos
Transport infrastructure in Thessaly
1972 establishments in Greece